The National Security Council (NSC) of Sri Lanka is the executive body of the Sri Lankan government that is charged with the maintenance of national security with authority to direct the Sri Lankan military and Police.

History
The National Security Council established in June 1999 by an Gazette notification, by President Chandrika Kumaratunga following the military set backs in Operation Jayasikurui taking over direct control of the military from her cousin General Anuruddha Ratwatte, the deputy defense minister. The NSC came to national attention following the 2019 Sri Lanka Easter bombings, in which Prime Minister Ranil Wickramasinghe claimed that although a member, he was not invited to NSC sessions chaired by President Maithripala Sirisena following the 2018 Sri Lankan constitutional crisis.

Membership

See also
 National security council

References

Military of Sri Lanka
Sri Lanka
1999 establishments in Sri Lanka